Mohamed Flissi (born 13 February 1990, in Boumerdès) is an Algerian boxer. He represented Algeria at the 2012 Summer Olympics in London, United Kingdom and at the 2016 Summer Olympics in Rio de Janeiro, Brazil. He qualified to represent Algeria again at the 2020 Summer Olympics in Tokyo, Japan.

Career

  2018 Beogradski Pobednik Belgrade, Serbia  – 52 kg
   2018 Arab Championships (Khartoum, Sudan )1st place – 52 kg
 2017 Preliminaries 1/8  World Championships Hamburg, Germany  – 52 kg
  2017 African Championships Brazzaville, Congo 1st place – 52 kg
 2016 Quarterfinals Olympic Games Rio de Janeiro, Brazil  – 52 kg
  2016 African Olympic Qualifier Yaounde, Cameroon 1st place – 52 kg
  2016 Duisenkul Shopokov  Bishkek, Kyrgyzstan  2nd place – 52 kg
  2015 World Championships Doha, Qatar 3rd place – 52 kg
   2015 All Africa Games (Brazzaville, CGO) 1st place – 52 kg 
   2015 African Amateur Boxing Championships (Casablanca, MAR) 1st place – 52 kg 
   2014 – African Cup of Nations (East London, RSA) 1st place – 52 kg
   2014 – Algerian National Championships 1st place – 49 kg W
  2013 AIBA World Boxing Championships (Almaty, KAZ) 2nd place – 49 kg 
   2013 Mediterranean Games (Mersin, TUR) 1st place – 49 kg 
   2013 – Giraldo Cordova Cardin Memorial Tournament (Havana, CUB) 3rd place – 49 kg 
   2013 – Limassol Boxing Tournament (Limassol, CYP) 1st place – 49 kg 
   2013 – Setif International Tournament (Setif, ALG) 1st place – 49 kg 
   2013 – Algerian National Cup 1st place – 49 kg
 2012 – London 2012 Olympic Games (London, GBR) participant – 49 kg
   2012 – AIBA African Olympic Qualification Tournament (Casablanca, MAR) 1st place – 49 kg
   2012 – Algerian National Federal Cup 1st place – 49 kg 
 2011 AIBA World Boxing Championships (Baku, AZE) participant – 49 kg
   2011 All-Africa Games (Maputo, MOZ) 2nd place – 49
   2011 – Arab Championships (Doha, QAT) 2nd place – 49 kg
   2011 – Algerian National Federation Cup 1st place – 49 kg 
   2010 World Combat Games (Beijing, CHN) 3rd place – 49 kg

World Series of Boxing record

References

External links
 

1990 births
Boxers at the 2012 Summer Olympics
Boxers at the 2016 Summer Olympics
Flyweight boxers
Light-flyweight boxers
Living people
People from Boumerdès
People from Boumerdès District
People from Boumerdès Province
Kabyle people
Olympic boxers of Algeria
Algerian male boxers
AIBA World Boxing Championships medalists
African Games gold medalists for Algeria
African Games medalists in boxing
African Games silver medalists for Algeria
Mediterranean Games gold medalists for Algeria
Mediterranean Games medalists in boxing
Competitors at the 2011 All-Africa Games
Competitors at the 2015 African Games
Competitors at the 2013 Mediterranean Games
Competitors at the 2019 African Games
Boxers at the 2020 Summer Olympics
21st-century Algerian people